Thibault Peyre (born 3 October 1992) is a French footballer who currently plays for Al-Batin in the Saudi Professional League.

Career
In January 2019, he moved to KV Mechelen.

On 6 January 2023, Peyre joined Saudi Arabian club Al-Batin.

Honours
Mechelen
 Belgian Cup: 2018–19

References

External links

1992 births
Living people
French footballers
Royal Excel Mouscron players
Royale Union Saint-Gilloise players
K.V. Mechelen players
Al Batin FC players
Belgian Pro League players
Saudi Professional League players
Association football forwards
Expatriate footballers in Saudi Arabia
French expatriate sportspeople in Saudi Arabia